The year 2015 was the 44th year after the independence of Bangladesh. It was also the third year of the third term of the Government of Sheikh Hasina.

Incumbents

 President: Abdul Hamid
 Prime Minister: Sheikh Hasina
 Chief Justice: Md. Muzammel Hossain (until 16 January), Surendra Kumar Sinha (starting 17 January)

Demography

Climate

Economy

Note: For the year 2015 average official exchange rate for BDT was 77.95 per US$.

Events

 5 January – Bangladeshi police report that two opposition Bangladesh Nationalist Party activists are shot dead in clashes with members of the ruling Awami League in the town of Natore on the first anniversary of disputed general election.
 3 February – In Chuddogram, anti-government protesters firebomb a bus full of sleeping passengers, leaving seven people dead.
 22 February – A ferry carrying 100 passengers capsizes in the Padma River after colliding with a trawler, with the death toll reaching 41.
 25 February – An arrest warrant is issued for Khaleda Zia, former Prime Minister of Bangladesh, after she fails to show up to face graft charges.
 27 February – Avijit Roy, an American writer and blogger from Bangladesh, is hacked to death by Islamist attackers in Dhaka.
 6 March – Customs officers at the Shahjalal International Airport catch Son Young Nam, a North Korean diplomat trying to smuggle an estimated $1.4 million worth of gold into Bangladesh. Bangladesh authorities release him.
 30 March – Another blogger, Washiqur Rahman, was killed in the Tejgaon neighborhood of Dhaka in an attack similar to that perpetrated on Avijit Roy. The police arrested two suspects near the scene and recovered meat cleavers from them.
 11 April – Bangladeshi Jamaat-e-Islami leader Muhammad Kamaruzzaman is executed for war crimes committed during the 1971 Liberation War.
 12 May – Bangladeshi secular blogger Ananta Bijoy Das is cut to pieces by a masked gang wielding machetes in the city of Sylhet. He is the third secular blogger to be killed in Bangladesh this year.
29 May- PM Sheikh Hasina is rewarded with the title "Deshratna" by "Jatiyo Nagorik Committee" head Syed Shamsul Haq at Suhrawardy Udyan.
 8 July – Thirteen-year-old Sheikh Mohammad Samiul Alam Rajon is lynched in the vicinity of Kumargaon Bus Stand, Sylhet, for allegedly trying to steal a rickshaw van.
 7 August – A gang of about six men armed with machetes attacks Niloy Chatterjee, a blogger, at his home in the Goran neighborhood of Dhaka and hacks him to death.
 6 September – Parliament passes the Financial Reporting Act 2015.
 14 September – Proposed 10% VAT on higher education was withdrawn by the cabinet in the aftermath of protests by students of private universities in Bangladesh.
 31 October – Faisal Arefin Dipan, the publisher of Jagriti Prakashani, was hacked to death in Dhaka. The attack followed another stabbing, earlier the same day, in which publisher Ahmedur Rashid Chowdhury and two writers, Ranadeep Basu and Tareque Rahim, were stabbed in their office at another publishing house. The three men were taken to hospital, and at least one was reported to be in critical condition.
 22 November – Two top Bangladeshi war criminals are hanged.

Awards and recognitions

International recognition
 Sir Fazle Hasan Abed, Founder of BRAC, wins the World Food Prize.

Independence Day Award

Ekushey Padak
 Abdur Rahman Boyati, arts (posthumous)
 Arup Ratan Choudhury, social service
 Jharna Dhara Chowdhury, social service
 SA Abul Hayat, arts
 Mohammad Nurul Huda, language and literature
 Kamal Lohani, journalism
 MA Mannan, education
 Satya Priya Mahathero, social service
 Mujibur Rahman Devdas, Liberation War
 Faridur Reza Sagar, mass media
 Sanat Kumar Saha, education
 Pearu Sardar, Language Movement (posthumous)
 ATM Shamsuzzaman, arts
 Dwijen Sharma, language and literature
 Abul Kalam Mohammed Zakaria, research

Sports
 Football:
 Bangladesh participated in 2015 SAFF Championship held in India. They secured their only victory against Bhutan and exited the tournament from the group stage.
 After a hiatus of 6 years, the 3rd edition of the Bangabandhu Cup was hosted by Bangladesh in early 2015 with six nations participating. Malaysia U-23 won the third edition, after beating Bangladesh U-23 in the final. This was also the first time the host reached the final of this tournament.
 Bangladesh youth team then secured the third place in the 1st edition of the SAFF U-19 Championship, an international football competition for men's under-19 national teams organized by SAFF. The tournament was hosted by Nepal from 20–29 August.
 Cricket:
 Pakistan toured Bangladesh from 15 April to 10 May, to play one Twenty20 International (T20I), three One Day Internationals (ODIs) and two Test matches. Pakistan won the Test series 1–0 after the first Test was drawn, but Bangladesh won the ODI series 3–0, its first ever series win against Pakistan; and also won the sole Twenty20 International played.
 Then the Indian cricket team toured Bangladesh from 10 to 24 June. The tour consisted of one Test match and three One Day International (ODI) matches. Because of the series taking place during monsoon season, each ODI had a reserve day allocated. The one-off Test finished in a draw and Bangladesh won the ODI series 2–1.
 Later the South African cricket team toured Bangladesh for a two-match International Twenty20 (T20I) series, a three-match One Day International (ODI) series and two Test matches against the Bangladesh national team from 3 July to 3 August. South Africa won Twenty20 International series by 2–0, while, Bangladesh won ODI series by 2–1. The Test series finished with both matches being drawn.
 The Zimbabwean cricket team toured Bangladesh in November to play 3 ODIs and 2 T20s. Bangladesh secured the ODI series 3-0, but the T20 series was tied 1–1.

Deaths
 3 January – Jamal Uddin Ahmad politician (b. 1929)
 5 January – Mizan Rahman, mathematician (b. 1932)
 5 January – Mustafa Kamal, former Chief Justice (b. 1933)
 15 January – Anwarul Iqbal former IGP of Police and advisor to caretaker government (b. 1950)
 24 January – Arafat Rahman, son of former President Ziaur Rahman and former Prime Minister Khaleda Zia (b. 1969)
 11 April – Muhammad Kamaruzzaman, politician, convicted war-criminal (b. 1952)
 5 May – Novera Ahmed, sculptor (b. 1939)
 18 May – Hasanuzzaman Khan, journalist (b. 1926)
 1 June – Serajur Rahman, journalist and broadcaster (b. 1934)
 7 June – Sheikh Razzak Ali, politician (b. 1928)
 29 June – Mujibur Rahman, scientist
 8 July – Amjad Khan Chowdhury, entrepreneur (b. 1937)
 27 August – Kazi Zafar Ahmed, politician (b. 1939)
 14 September – Syed Mohsin Ali, politician (b. 1948)
 28 October – Dilip Barua, footballer (b. 1946)
 14 November – A. K. M. Nurul Islam, politician (b. 1919)
 20 November – Chowdhury Sajjadul Karim, scientist and former advisor to caretaker government (b. 1948)
 22 November – Ali Ahsan Mohammad Mojaheed, politician and convicted war criminal (b. 1948)
 22 November – Salahuddin Quader Chowdhury, politician and convicted war criminal (b. 1949)
 3 December – Omar Ali, poet (b. 1939)

See also 
 2010s in Bangladesh
 List of Bangladeshi films of 2015
 2014–15 Bangladeshi cricket season
 2015–16 Bangladeshi cricket season
 Timeline of Bangladeshi history

References

 
Bangladesh
Bangladesh
2010s in Bangladesh
Years of the 21st century in Bangladesh